Cesare Salvadori (22 September 1941 – 8 August 2021) was an Italian sabre fencer. He won a gold and two silver medals with the Italian team at the 1964, 1968, and 1972 Olympics. His best individual achievement at the Summer Games was ninth place in 1964.

References

External links
 
 
 

1941 births
2021 deaths
Italian male fencers
Olympic fencers of Italy
Fencers at the 1964 Summer Olympics
Fencers at the 1968 Summer Olympics
Fencers at the 1972 Summer Olympics
Olympic gold medalists for Italy
Olympic silver medalists for Italy
Olympic medalists in fencing
Sportspeople from Turin
Medalists at the 1964 Summer Olympics
Medalists at the 1968 Summer Olympics
Medalists at the 1972 Summer Olympics
Universiade medalists in fencing
Universiade silver medalists for Italy
Medalists at the 1967 Summer Universiade